Zhao Junzhe (born 19 April 1979) is a Chinese football coach and former professional footballer who is currently the head coach of Chinese Super League club Cangzhou Mighty Lions. He spent his entire playing career at Liaoning F.C..

Club career
Zhao Junzhe was promoted to Liaoning F.C.'s first team from the club's youth academy and made his debut in the 1998 season. He continued to be a vital member for Liaoning that season when he aided them to being runners-up and the Chinese FA Cup. He was soon promoted to club captain and won the Chinese Football Association Player of the Year award in 2004. The following seasons saw the club's fortunes fall and Zhao unfortunately led the team to relegation to the second tier at the end of the 2008 season. Despite this setback, he remained with the team and immediately led Liaoning back up to the top tier when they won the second tier title in the 2009 season. Zhao announced his retirement from football at the end of the 2016 season. On 30 October 2016, he made last appearance in his career in a league match against Jiangsu Suning.

International career
Zhao was included into the Chinese national team by then manager Bora Milutinović for the 2002 FIFA World Cup. Though his chances were limited on the national team at the time, he did play in two group stage matches during the tournament and nearly scored by hitting the post against Brazil. He played a vital role in the 2004 AFC Asian Cup in which China finished the tournament as runners-up.

Managerial career
On 29 September 2017, Zhao was appointed as the caretaker manager of Liaoning FC, who sat at the bottom of the league table. On 14 October, in his first game as manager, he guided Liaoning to a 3–3 draw against second place team Shanghai SIPG. However, Liaoning finally relegated to the second tier after losing the last three matches of the season. On 12 December 2017, Zhao's caretaker spell ended when Chen Yang became the manager of Liaoning.

On 21 February 2023, Zhao was appointed as the head coach of Chinese Super League club Cangzhou Mighty Lions.

Career statistics

Club

International

International goals
Results list China's goal tally first.

Managerial statistics

Honours

Player

Club
Liaoning Whowin
China League One: 2009
Chinese FA Super Cup: 1999

Individual
AFC Asian Cup All-Star Team: 2004
Chinese Football Association Player of the Year: 2004
Chinese Super League Team of the Year: 2002, 2003

Personal life
Zhao is of Manchu ethnicity from Aisin Gioro clan. He is a descendant of Boolungga, who is the brother of Giocangga.

References

External links
Profile on China national football team official web site
Official blog

2002 China team profile at BBC website

1979 births
Living people
Footballers from Shenyang
Association football midfielders
Chinese footballers
China international footballers
Chinese football managers
2002 FIFA World Cup players
2004 AFC Asian Cup players
Liaoning F.C. players
Chinese Super League players
China League One players
Asian Games medalists in football
Footballers at the 1998 Asian Games
Manchu sportspeople
Asian Games bronze medalists for China
Medalists at the 1998 Asian Games